Jeffrey David Sachs (born November 5, 1954) is an American economist, academic, public policy analyst, and former director of The Earth Institute at Columbia University, where he holds the title of University Professor. He is known for his work on sustainable development, economic development, and the fight to end poverty.

Sachs is Director of the Center for Sustainable Development at Columbia University and President of the UN Sustainable Development Solutions Network. 
He is an SDG Advocate for United Nations (UN) Secretary-General António Guterres on the Sustainable Development Goals (SDGs), a set of 17 global goals adopted at a UN summit meeting in September 2015. From 2001 to 2018, Sachs served as Special Advisor to the UN Secretary General, and held the same position under the previous UN Secretary-General Ban Ki-moon and prior to 2016 a similar advisory position related to the earlier Millennium Development Goals (MDGs), eight internationally sanctioned objectives to reduce extreme poverty, hunger and disease by 2015. In connection with the MDGs, he had first been appointed special adviser to the UN Secretary-General in 2002 during the term of Kofi Annan.

Sachs is co-founder and chief strategist of Millennium Promise Alliance, a nonprofit organization dedicated to ending extreme poverty and hunger that has come under scrutiny from critics and was the subject of a book by the journalist Nina Munk. From 2002 to 2006, he was director of the United Nations Millennium Project's work on the MDGs. He is co-editor of the World Happiness Report with John F. Helliwell and Richard Layard. In 2010, he became a commissioner for the Broadband Commission for Sustainable Development, whose stated aim is to boost the importance of broadband internet in international policy. Sachs has written several books and received several awards. He has been criticized for his views on economics, the origin of COVID-19, and his advocacy for the Chinese government.

Early life and education 
Sachs was raised in Oak Park, Michigan, in the Detroit metro area, and is the son of Joan (née Abrams) and Theodore Sachs, a labor lawyer. His family is Jewish. He graduated from Oak Park High School and attended Harvard College, where he received his Bachelor of Arts, summa cum laude, in 1976. He went on to receive his M.A. and Ph.D. in economics from Harvard with his thesis titled Factor Costs and Macroeconomic Adjustment in the Open Economy: Theory and Evidence and was invited to join the Harvard Society of Fellows while still a Harvard graduate student.

Academic career

Harvard University 
In 1980, Sachs joined the Harvard faculty as an assistant professor and was promoted to associate professor in 1982. A year later at the age of 28, he became a professor of economics with tenure at Harvard.

During the next 19 years at Harvard, Sachs became the Galen L. Stone Professor of International Trade, director of the Harvard Institute for International Development (1995–1999) and director of the Center for International Development at Harvard Kennedy School (1999–2002).

Columbia University 
Sachs is the Director of the Center for Sustainable Development at Columbia University. He is University Professor at Columbia University. From 2002 to 2016, Sachs served as director of the Earth Institute of Columbia University, a university-wide organization, with an interdisciplinary approach to addressing complex issues facing the Earth, in support of sustainable development. Sachs's classes are taught at the School of International and Public Affairs and the Mailman School of Public Health, and his course "Challenges of Sustainable Development" is taught at the undergraduate level.

Scholarship, consulting, and activism 
Sachs has advised several countries on economic policy, including the United Arab Emirates.

Bolivia 
When Bolivia was shifting from a dictatorship to a democracy through national elections in 1985, Sachs was invited by the party of Bolivian dictator Hugo Banzer to advise him on an anti-inflation economic plan to implement once he was voted to office. This stabilization plan centered around price deregulation, particularly for oil, along with cuts to the national budget. Sachs stated that his plan could end Bolivian hyperinflation, which had reached up to 14,000%, in a single day. Although Banzer ultimately lost the election to the party of former elected president and traditionally developmentalist Víctor Paz Estenssoro, Sachs's plan was still implemented through plans that excluded most of Paz's cabinet. Inflation quickly stabilized in Bolivia.

Sachs' suggestion for reducing inflation was to apply fiscal and monetary discipline and end economic regulation that protected the elites and blocked the free market. Hyperinflation reduced within weeks of the Bolivian government instituting his suggestions and the government settled its $3.3 billion debt to international lenders for about 11 cents on the dollar. At the time, this was around 85% of Bolivia's GDP.

Advising in post-communist economies 
Sachs has worked as an economic adviser to governments in Latin America, Eastern Europe and the former Soviet Union. A practice trained macroeconomist, he advised a number of national governments in the transition from Marxism–Leninism or developmentalism to market economies.

In 1989, Sachs advised Poland's anticommunist Solidarity movement and the government of Prime Minister Tadeusz Mazowiecki. He wrote a comprehensive plan for the transition from central planning to a market economy which became incorporated into Poland's reform program led by Finance Minister Leszek Balcerowicz. Sachs was the main architect of Poland's debt reduction operation. Sachs and IMF economist David Lipton advised the rapid conversion of all property and assets from public to private ownership. Closure of many uncompetitive factories ensued. In Poland, Sachs was firmly on the side of rapid transition to capitalism. At first, he proposed American-style corporate structures, with professional managers answering to many shareholders and a large economic role for stock markets. That did not bode well with the Polish authorities, but he then proposed that large blocks of the shares of privatized companies be placed in the hands of private banks. As a result, there were some economic shortages and inflation, but prices in Poland eventually stabilized. The government of Poland awarded Sachs with one of its highest honors in 1999, the Commander's Cross of the Order of Merit. He also received an honorary doctorate from the Kraków University of Economics.

Sachs's ideas and methods of transition from central planning were adopted throughout the transition economies. He advised Slovenia in 1991 and Estonia in 1992 on the introduction of new stable and convertible currencies. Based on Poland's success, he was invited first by Soviet President Mikhail Gorbachev and then by Russian President Boris Yeltsin on the transition to a market economy. He served as adviser to Prime Minister Yegor Gaidar and Finance Minister Boris Federov during 1991–1993 on macroeconomic policies. Sachs' methods for stabilising economies became known as shock therapy and were similar to successful approaches used in Germany after the two world wars. When Russia fell into poverty after adopting his market-based shock therapy in the early 1990's, some Western media called him a cold-hearted neo-liberal.

Work on global economic development 
Since his work in post-communist countries, Sachs has turned to global issues of economic development, poverty alleviation, health and aid policy and environmental sustainability. He has written extensively on climate change, disease control and globalization. Since 1995, he has been engaged in efforts to alleviate poverty in Africa.

In his 2005 work The End of Poverty, Sachs wrote that "Africa's governance is poor because Africa is poor". According to Sachs, with the right policies and key interventions, extreme poverty—defined as living on less than $1 a day—can be eradicated within 20 years. India and China serve as examples, with the latter lifting 300 million people out of extreme poverty during the last two decades. Sachs has said that a key element to accomplishing this is raising aid from $65 billion in 2002 to $195 billion a year by 2015. He emphasizes the role of geography and climate as much of Africa is landlocked and disease-prone. However, he stresses that these problems can be overcome.

Sachs suggests that with improved seeds, irrigation and fertilizer, the crop yields in Africa and other places with subsistence farming can be increased from 1 ton per hectare to 3 to 5 tons per hectare. He reasons that increased harvests would significantly increase the income of subsistence farmers, thereby reducing poverty. Sachs does not believe that increased aid is the only solution. He also supports establishing credit and microloan programs which are often lacking in impoverished areas. Sachs advocates the distribution of free insecticide-treated bed nets to combat malaria. The economic impact of malaria has been estimated to cost Africa $12 billion per year. Sachs estimates that malaria can be controlled for $3 billion per year, therefore suggesting that anti-malaria projects would be an economically justified investment.

The Millennium Villages Project (MVP) which he directs operates in more than a dozen African countries and covers more than 500,000 people. The MVP has created controversy because critics have questioned both the design of the project and claims made for its success. In 2012, The Economist reviewed the project and concluded "the evidence does not yet support the claim that the millennium villages project is making a decisive impact". Critics have pointed to the failure to include suitable controls that would allow an accurate determination of whether the MVP methods were responsible for any observed gains in economic development. A 2012 Lancet paper claiming a three-fold increase in the rate of decline in childhood mortality was criticized for flawed methodology and the authors later admitted that the claim was "unwarranted and misleading". In her 2013 book, The Idealist: Jeffrey Sachs and the Quest to End Poverty, journalist Nina Munk concluded that the MVP was a failure.

Following the adoption of the Millennium Development Goals (MDGs) in 2000, Sachs chaired the WHO Commission on Macroeconomics and Health (2000–2001) which played a pivotal role in scaling up the financing of health care and disease control in the low-income countries to support MDGs 4, 5 and 6. He worked with UN Secretary-General Kofi Annan in 2000–2001 to design and launch The Global Fund to Fight AIDS, Tuberculosis and Malaria. He also worked with senior officials of the George W. Bush administration to develop the PEPFAR program to fight HIV/AIDS and the PMI to fight malaria. On behalf of Annan, from 2002 to 2006 he chaired the UN Millennium Project which was tasked with developing a concrete action plan to achieve the MDGs. The UN General Assembly adopted the key recommendations of the UN Millennium Project at a special session in September 2005.

Previously a special adviser to secretary-general António Guterres, Sachs is an advocate for the 2015 Sustainable Development Goals which build upon and supersede the MDGs.

In his capacity as a special adviser at the UN, Sachs has frequently met with foreign dignitaries and heads of state. He developed a friendship with international celebrities Bono and Angelina Jolie, who traveled to Africa with Sachs to witness the progress of the Millennium Villages.

Sachs has consistently criticised the International Monetary Fund and its policies around the world and blamed international bankers for what he says is a pattern of ineffective investment strategies. 

During the Greek government-debt crisis in July 2015, Sachs, Heiner Flassbeck, Thomas Piketty, Dani Rodrik and Simon Wren-Lewis, published an open letter to the Chancellor of Germany Angela Merkel, regarding Greek debt.

Sachs is one of the founders of the Deep Decarbonization Pathways Project.

Views and commentary

Nuclear power
Sachs believes nuclear power is the only solution to climate change.

China
Sachs believes the term “genocide” is mistaken in relation to the repression of the Uyghurs in China. He has argued for closer relations between the US and China and warned of the danger of tensions between them.

Syria
In April 2018, he supported President Donald Trump's view that the United States should come out of Syria "very soon", adding: "It's long past time for the United States to end its destructive military engagement in Syria and across the Middle East, though the security state seems unlikely to let this happen".

War in Ukraine
In June 2022 Sachs co-signed an open letter calling for a "ceasefire" in the 2022 Russian invasion of Ukraine, questioning Western countries' continuing military support for Ukraine.
He blamed the US role for the War in Ukraine, claiming it "wrongly conspired" in the overthrow of president Viktor Yanukovych in 2014, and then pushed "NATO enlargement to encircle Russia".

Sachs has suggested that the US was responsible for the sabotage of the Nord Stream pipeline. In February 2023, he was invited by the Russian government to address the United Nations Security Council about the topic.

Venezuela
A 2019 report authored by Sachs and Mark Weisbrot, published by the Center for Economic and Policy Research, claimed that a 31% rise in the number of deaths between 2017 and 2018 was due to the sanctions imposed on Venezuela in 2017 and that 40,000 people in Venezuela may have died as a result. The report states: "The sanctions are depriving Venezuelans of lifesaving medicines, medical equipment, food, and other essential imports." Weisbrot stated that the authors "could not prove those excess deaths were the result of sanctions, but said the increase ran parallel to the imposition of the measures and an attendant fall in oil production."

A United States Department of State spokesperson commented that "as the writers themselves concede, the report is based on speculation and conjecture." Harvard economist Ricardo Hausmann asserts that the analysis is flawed because it makes invalid assumptions about Venezuela based on a different country like Colombia, saying that "taking what happened in Colombia since 2017 as a counterfactual for what would have happened in Venezuela if there had been no financial sanctions makes no sense." Calling it "sloppy reasoning", the authors also state that the analysis failed to rule out other explanations and failed to correctly account for PDVSA finances.

COVID-19
Sachs says he is “pretty convinced,” though “not sure” that COVID-19 came out of "US lab biotechnology,” which is considered by the European Union to be COVID-19 disinformation by China. While Sachs has leanings toward the possibility of a virus leak from a "U.S.-backed laboratory research program," he has stated that "A natural spillover is also possible, of course. Both hypotheses are viable at this stage."

In August 2022 Sachs appeared on the podcast of anti-vaccine conspiracy theorist Robert F. Kennedy Jr. where he accused officials like Anthony Fauci of "not being honest” about the origins of COVID.

Sachs was the chair of The Lancet's COVID-19 Commission: who's goals are to provide recommendations for public health policy and improve the practice of medicine. In September 2022 a panel assembled by The Lancet published a wide-ranging report on the pandemic, including commentary on the virus origin overseen by Sachs. This suggested that the virus may have originated from an American laboratory, a notion long supported by Sachs.

Alongside his colleague, Neil L. Harrison, he wrote an article calling for an independent inquiry into the origin of COVID-19. Their primary concern stems from the presence of a furin cleavage site in the amino acid sequence of the coronavirus spike protein, identical to the one found in the α-subunit of the epithelial sodium channel (ENaC-α). An unfunded grant written by a research team (including Shi Zhengli of the Wuhan Institute of Virology) submitted to DARPA in 2018 discusses such an approach for establishing zoonotic potential. This prompted several responses from virologist Robert Garry who pointed out that:
 The number of inserted nucleotides depends on the sequence compared against and the sequence alignment used. The closest known spike protein has 12 inserted nucleotides while the sequence mentioned by Harrison and Sachs has 24 inserted nucleuotides.
 The insertion point introduces a frameshift mutation which could drastically affect translation process and is an "unusual and needlessly complex feat of genetic engineering" 
 The insertion adds a codon for proline not originally found in ENaC, which could drastically affect the eventual protein structure
 The genetic sequence inserted is almost completely different from that used in human ENaC cells, (but codes for the same amino acid sequence since differences are all cases of synonymous substitution)
 Portions of the amino acid sequence deemed suspicious also appear in the spike regions of other coronaviruses
Other virologist reacting to this, including Angela Rasmussen, commented that this may have been "one of The Lancet'''s most shameful moments regarding its role as a steward and leader in communicating crucial findings about science and medicine." Virologist David Robertson said the suggestion of US laboratory involvement was "wild speculation" and that "it's really disappointing to see such a potentially influential report contributing to further misinformation on such an important topic."

 Critical reception 

Economics
Sachs's economic philosophies have been the subject of controversy. Nina Munk, author of the 2013 book The Idealist: Jeffrey Sachs and the Quest to End Poverty, says that, although well intended, poverty eradication projects endorsed by Sachs have years later "left people even worse off than before".

William Easterly, a professor of economics at New York University, reviewed The End of Poverty for the Washington Post, calling Sachs' poverty eradication plan "a sort of Great Leap Forward". According to Easterly's cross-country statistical analysis in his book The White Man's Burden, from 1985 to 2006, "When we control both for initial poverty and for bad government, it is bad government that explains the slower growth. We cannot statistically discern any effect of initial poverty on subsequent growth once we control for bad government. This is still true if we limit the definition of bad government to corruption alone." Easterly deems the massive aid as proposed by Sachs to be ineffective, as its effect will be hampered by bad governance and/or corruption.

Commenting on Sachs' $120 million effort to aid Africa, American travel writer and novelist Paul Theroux says these temporary measures failed to create sustained improvements. Theroux focuses on a project in a sparsely populated community of nomadic camel herders in Dertu, Kenya, funded by Sachs' Millennium Villages Project, which cost  million over a three-year period. Theroux says that the project's latrines were clogged and overflowing, the dormitories it built quickly became dilapidated, and the livestock market it established ignored local customs and was shut down within a few months. He says that an angry Dertu citizen filed a 15-point written complaint against Sachs' operation, claiming it "created dependence" and that "the project is supposed to be bottom top approached but it is visa versa."

According to the Canadian journalist Naomi Klein, Jeffrey Sachs is one of the architects of "disaster capitalism" after his recommendations in Bolivia, Poland and Russia led to millions of people ending up in the streets. According to economists Daron Acemoglu and James A. Robinson, when Sachs criticized their work on institutions and economic growth, he used a strategy of "throw[ing] a lot of mud, hoping that some of it would stick". American writer Michael Busch commented that Sachs was incapable of identifying issues in others' ideas and cannot tolerate challenges to his own work.

China
In December 2018, Huawei Chief Financial Officer Meng Wanzhou was arrested in Canada at the request of the U.S., which was seeking her extradition to face charges of allegedly violating sanctions against Iran. Soon after Meng's arrest, Sachs wrote an article in which he said her arrest was part of efforts to contain China and accused the U.S. of hypocrisy for seeking her extradition. He wrote that none of the executives of several U.S. companies which had been fined for sanctions violations were arrested. After he was criticised for the article, Sachs closed his Twitter account, which had 260,000 followers. Isaac Stone Fish, a senior fellow at Asia Society, noted that Sachs had written a foreword to a Huawei position paper, and questioned whether Sachs had been paid by Huawei. Sachs said he had not been paid for the work.

In June 2020, Sachs said the targeting of Huawei by the US was not solely about security. In their 2020 book Hidden Hand, Clive Hamilton and Mareike Ohlberg comment on one of Sachs' articles in which he accuses the U.S. government of maligning Huawei under hypocritical pretenses. Hamilton and Ohlberg write that Sachs' article would be more meaningful and influential if he did not have a close relationship with Huawei, including his previous endorsement of the company's "vision of our shared digital future". The authors also allege that Sachs has ties to a number of Chinese state bodies and the private energy corporation CEFC China Energy for which he has spoken.

During a January 2021 interview, despite the interviewer's repeated prompting, Sachs evaded questions about China's repression of Uyghur people and referred to "huge human rights abuses committed by the U.S." Subsequently, 19 advocacy and rights groups jointly wrote a letter to Columbia University questioning Sachs' comments. The letter's signatories wrote that Sachs took the same stance as China's Ministry of Foreign Affairs, a digression to the history of U.S. rights violations as a way to avoid discussions of China's mistreatment of Uyghurs. The rights groups went on to say that Sachs "betrayed his institution's mission" by trivializing the perspective of those who were oppressed by the Chinese government. Stephan Richter, editor-in-chief at The Globalist, and J.D. Bindenagel, a former U.S. Ambassador, wrote that Sachs is "actively agitating(!) for a classic Communist propaganda ploy".

Ukraine
Sachs' views on the war in Ukraine - and specifically his belief that NATO was responsible for it - have been widely criticised as poorly informed, for example by James Kirchick in The Atlantic and Alexander J. Motyl in The Hill.

 Personal life 
Sachs lives in New York City with his wife Sonia Ehrlich Sachs, a pediatrician. They have three children. Sachs endorsed Bernie Sanders in the 2020 Democratic Party presidential primaries and has provided advice to Sanders.

 Awards and honors 

In 2004 and 2005, Sachs was named one of the 100 Most Influential People in the World by Time. He was also named one of the "500 Most Influential People in the Field of Foreign Policy" by the World Affairs Councils of America.

In 1993, the New York Times called Sachs "probably the most important economist in the world."
In 2005, Sachs received the Sargent Shriver Award for Equal Justice. In 2007, he was awarded the Padma Bhushan, the third highest civilian honor bestowed by the government of India. Also in 2007, he received the Cardozo Journal of Conflict Resolution International Advocate for Peace Award and the Centennial Medal from the Harvard Graduate School of Arts and Sciences for his contributions to society.

In 2007, Sachs received the S. Roger Horchow Award for Greatest Public Service by a Private Citizen, an award given out annually by Jefferson Awards.

From 2000 to 2001, Sachs was chairman of the Commission on Macroeconomics and Health of the World Health Organization (WHO) and from 1999 to 2000 he served as a member of the International Financial Institution Advisory Commission established by the United States Congress. Sachs has been an adviser to the WHO, the World Bank, the Organisation for Economic Co-operation and Development, the International Monetary Fund, and the United Nations Development Program. He is a member of the Institute of Medicine, the American Academy of Arts and Sciences, Harvard Society of Fellows, the Fellows of the World Econometric Society, the Brookings Panel of Economists, the National Bureau of Economic Research and the Board of Advisers of the Chinese Economists Society, among other international organizations. Sachs is also the first holder of the Royal Professor Ungku Aziz Chair in Poverty Studies at the Centre for Poverty and Development Studies at the University of Malaya in Kuala Lumpur, Malaysia for 2007–2009. He holds an honorary professorship at the Universidad del Pacifico in Peru. He has lectured at the London School of Economics, the University of Oxford and Yale University and in Tel Aviv and Jakarta.

In September 2008, Vanity Fair ranked Sachs 98th on its list of 100 members of the New Establishment. In July 2009, Sachs became a member of the Netherlands Development Organisation's International Advisory Board. In 2009, Princeton University's American Whig-Cliosophic Society awarded Sachs the James Madison Award for Distinguished Public Service.

In 2016, Sachs became president of the Eastern Economic Association, succeeding Janet Currie.

In 2017, Sachs and his wife were the joint recipients of the first World Sustainability Award. In 2015, Sachs was awarded the Blue Planet Prize for his contributions to solving global environmental problems.

In May 2017 Sachs was awarded the Boris Mints Institute Prize for Research of Strategic Policy Solutions to Global Challenges.

In 2022 Sachs was awarded the Tang Prize in the category of sustainable development.

 Publications 
Sachs writes a monthly foreign affairs column for Project Syndicate, a nonprofit association of newspapers around the world that is circulated in 145 countries. He is also a frequent contributor to such major publications as the Financial Times, Scientific American, Time and The Huffington Post.

 Selected works 
 
 
 
 
 
 
 
 
 
 
Kirkman, Geoffrey S., Cornelius, Peter K., Sach, Jeffrey D. and Schwab, Klaus, eds. The Global Information Technology Report 2001 – 2002: Readiness for the Networked World. New York,  Oxford University Press (2002). , 
 Sachs, Jeffrey (2002). A New Global Effort to Control Malaria (Science), Vol. 298, October 4, 2002
 Sachs, Jeffrey (2002). Resolving the Debt Crisis of Low-Income Countries (Brookings Papers on Economic Activity), 2002:1
 Sachs, Jeffrey (2001).  The Strategic Significance of Global Inequality (The Washington Quarterly), Vol. 24, No. 3, Summer 2001
 Sachs, Jeffrey (1997). Development Economics Blackwell Publishers 
 
 
 
 Sachs, Jeffrey (ed) (1991). Developing Country Debt and Economic Performance, Volume 1 : The International Financial System (National Bureau of Economic Research Project Report) University of Chicago Press 
 Sachs, Jeffrey and Warwick McKibbin Global Linkages: Macroeconomic Interdependence and Co-operation in the World Economy'', Brookings Institution, June, 277 pages.
 
 Bruno, Michael and Sachs, Jeffrey (1984), "Stagflation in the World Economy"

References

External links 

 

1954 births
Living people
20th-century American economists
21st-century American economists
American officials of the United Nations
Carnegie Council for Ethics in International Affairs
Columbia School of International and Public Affairs faculty
Columbia University faculty
American development economists
Development specialists
Economists from Michigan
Fellows of the American Academy of Arts and Sciences
Fellows of the Econometric Society
Harvard College alumni
Harvard Institute for International Development
Harvard University faculty
Institute for New Economic Thinking
International finance economists
Keynesians
Members of the National Academy of Medicine
People from Detroit
People in international development
Recipients of the Padma Bhushan in literature & education
Scientific American people
Under-Secretaries-General of the United Nations
Writers about globalization